is a passenger railway station  located in Kita-ku Kobe, Hyōgo Prefecture, Japan. It is operated by the private transportation company, Kobe Electric Railway (Shintetsu).

Lines

Station layout
The station consists of one side platform serving a single bidirectional track. The station is unattended.

Adjacent stations

History
On 18 December 1928, Gosha Station was opened in tandem with the opening of the Sanda Line.

Passenger statistics
In fiscal 2019, the station was used by an average of 1,914 passengers daily

Surrounding area
Arino River
Hyogo Prefectural Route 15 Kobe Sanda Line (Arima Highway)

See also
List of railway stations in Japan

References

External links 

 Official home page 

Railway stations in Kobe
Railway stations in Japan opened in 1928